Confession room may refer to:

 The Confession Room, a 2014 British musical comedy
 Confessional, an enclosed space for confessing to a priest in Catholic and some Protestant churches, also known as a confession room
 Confession room, a feature in some reality television shows